Roger Federer defeated Rafael Nadal in the final, 6–4, 3–6, 6–1, 3–6, 6–3 to win the men's singles tennis title at the 2017 Australian Open. It was his fifth Australian Open title and record-extending 18th major title overall. Federer became the oldest men's singles major champion since Ken Rosewall at the 1972 Australian Open. Nadal was attempting to become the first man in the Open Era to achieve a double career Grand Slam.

Novak Djokovic was the two-time defending champion, but lost in the second round to Denis Istomin. It was the first time since the 2008 Wimbledon Championships that Djokovic failed to reach the third round of a major and the first time since 2006 that he failed to do so at the Australian Open. With top-seed Andy Murray losing in the fourth round, this marked the first time since the 2004 French Open that the top two seeds both failed to reach the quarterfinals of a men's singles major.

This marked the first major tournament for future world No. 1 and US Open champion Daniil Medvedev; he lost in the first round.

Seeds

  Andy Murray (fourth round)
  Novak Djokovic (second round)
  Milos Raonic  (quarterfinals)
  Stan Wawrinka (semifinals)
  Kei Nishikori (fourth round)
  Gaël Monfils (fourth round)
  Marin Čilić (second round)
  Dominic Thiem (fourth round)
  Rafael Nadal (final)
  Tomáš Berdych (third round)
  David Goffin (quarterfinals)
  Jo-Wilfried Tsonga (quarterfinals)
  Roberto Bautista Agut (fourth round)
  Nick Kyrgios (second round)
  Grigor Dimitrov (semifinals)
  Lucas Pouille (first round)

  Roger Federer (champion)
  Richard Gasquet (third round)
  John Isner (second round)
  Ivo Karlović (third round)
  David Ferrer (third round)
  Pablo Cuevas (first round)
  Jack Sock (third round)
  Alexander Zverev (third round)
  Gilles Simon (third round)
  Albert Ramos-Viñolas (first round)
  Bernard Tomic (third round)
  Feliciano López (first round)
  Viktor Troicki (third round)
  Pablo Carreño Busta (third round)
  Sam Querrey (third round)
  Philipp Kohlschreiber (third round)

Draw

Finals

Top half

Section 1

Section 2

Section 3

Section 4

Bottom half

Section 5

Section 6

Section 7

Section 8

Seeded players
The following are the seeded players and notable players who withdrew from the event. Seeding are arranged according to rankings on 9 January 2017, while ranking and points before are as of 16 January 2017.

Other entry information

Wildcards

Protected ranking

Qualifiers

Lucky losers

Withdrawals

Retirements

Notes

References
General

Men's Singles drawsheet on ausopen.com

Specific

External links
 2017 Australian Open – Men's draws and results at the International Tennis Federation

Men's Singles
Australian Open (tennis) by year – Men's singles
Australian Open – Men's Singles